Anders Hansen Grønneberg (1779 – 30 October 1819) was a Norwegian Naval officer and farmer who served as a representative at the Norwegian Constituent Assembly in 1814.

Anders Grønneberg was born on Ødelund in Berg parish at Brunlanes in Vestfold, Norway where his father was district sheriff. In his youth he had stayed with an uncle in London, where he learned to speak English, as well as German and French. As a young man, Grønneberg was a sailor. During the Napoleonic Wars, he was appointed Lieutenant in the Royal Norwegian Navy. Later he settled on the family farm.

He represented Larvik grevskap at the Norwegian Constituent Assembly in 1814, together with Iver Hesselberg and Ole Olsen Amundrød. At Eidsvoll, he joined the independence party (Selvstendighetspartiet),  but he was not active in the debates.

References

External links
Representantene på Eidsvoll 1814 (Cappelen Damm AS)
 Men of Eidsvoll (eidsvollsmenn)

Related Reading
 Holme Jørn (2014) De kom fra alle kanter - Eidsvollsmennene og deres hus  (Oslo: Cappelen Damm) 

1779 births
1819 deaths
People from Larvik
Fathers of the Constitution of Norway